Baptist Hospital may refer to:

in Cameroon
 Baptist Hospital Banyo, in Banyo, Cameroon

in Hong Kong
 Hong Kong Baptist Hospital, in Hong Kong

in the Philippines
 Bethel Baptist Hospital, in the Philippines

in the United States
 Baptist Hospital of Miami, in Miami, Florida
 Baptist Hospital (Pensacola), Florida
 Atlanta Medical Center (formerly Georgia Baptist Hospital)
 Clovis Baptist Hospital, in Clovis, New Mexico
 Prisma Health Baptist Hospital, in South Carolina
 Baptist Hospital (Nashville), Tennessee
 Saint Thomas - Midtown Hospital (Nashville) (formerly Baptist Hospita), in Nashville, Tennessee

Other uses in the United States
 Baptist Health (Arkansas), a network of nine hospitals in Arkansas
 Baptist Health, a network of five hospitals in Jacksonville, Florida
 Baptist Health (Kentucky), a network of seven hospitals throughout Kentucky
 Baptist Health South Florida, a faith-based not-for-profit healthcare organization and clinical care network in southern Florida
 Baptist Health System, a health system in San Antonio, Texas

See also
 Baptist Medical Center (disambiguation)
 Baptist Memorial Hospital (disambiguation)